Fylakio (Greek: Φυλάκιο) is a village in the Evros regional unit of northeast Greece. Fylakio is in the municipal unit of Kyprinos. In 2011 the population of Fylakio was 595 for the village and 971 for the community, including the villages Ammovouno and Keramos. It is located on the right bank of the river Ardas, about halfway between Ivaylovgrad (Bulgaria) and Edirne (Turkey).

Population

History

Towards the end of Ottoman rule, Fylakio's inhabitants were 3/4 Bulgarian and 1/4 Turkish. After a brief period of Bulgarian rule between 1913 and 1919, it became part of Greece. Greek refugees from  Asia Minor arrived in the village following the end of the war.

Fylakio detention center

South east of the village there is an immigration detention center housing people arrested for illegally crossing the nearby border with Turkey.

See also
List of settlements in the Evros regional unit

External links
Fylakio on GTP Travel Pages

References

Populated places in Evros (regional unit)
Greece–Turkey border
Bulgaria–Greece border